The 2008–09 Bangalore Super Division was the eighth season of the Bangalore Super Division, the third tier of the Indian football system and the top tier of the Karnataka football system. It began on 19 February 2009 and concluded on 9 May.

A total of 15 teams competed in the league. HASC emerged as champion.

References

External links 
 BDFA - Bangalore Super Division 2008/09 at indianfootball.de

Bangalore Super Division seasons
3